Teekay specialise in shipping crude oil.

History
Teekay was founded in 1973 by Torben Karlshoej, then a 31 year old Danish ship broker who had emigrated to the United States at the age of 20 and mostly worked on farms. The company was named "TK" for Karlshoej's initials. It commenced operations by purchasing small second and third hand oil tankers, a lucrative trade due to the high oil prices during the 1973–1974 oil crisis. It maintained a head office in the Bahamas, thus taking advantage of low corporate taxes. Most of its ships were registered in Liberia, thus taking advantage of the comparatively low taxes and the ability to recruit seafarers from across the world. The company grew in the 1980s by operating in the risky waters off Persian Gulf during the Iran–Iraq War.

Under Karlshoej's leadership, the company grew further from a tanker operator to an operational ship owner in the conventional shipping market. Over the years, Teekay expanded across new segments including gas and offshore. Teekay currently operates under two companies that are publicly traded on the New York Stock Exchange: Teekay Corporation and Teekay Tankers.

Offshore operations
In 1998, Teekay commenced operations under what is now called Petrojarl. It commenced offshore oil exploration as Golar Nor Offshore, a part of Petroleum Geo-Services (PGS) and Golar-Nor. 

In December 2002, Teekay acquired Navion ASA from Statoil. The acquisition was successfully completed on April 7, 2003, and the included shuttle tanker subsidiary, Ugland Nordic Shipping (UNS) became known as Teekay Navion Shuttle Tankers & Offshore (TNSTO), with their headquarters in Stavanger, Norway.

In August 2006, Teekay further expanded their Offshore business with the acquisition of Petrojarl ASA. In 2008, Teekay acquired all remaining shares of the company. 

In 2005 the company purchased the shuttle tanker Rita Knutsen. This was followed in 2007, with the Russian tanker Che Guevara which was subsequently converted into the FPSO Petrojarl Cidade de Rio das Ostras. In 2006, Petrojarl ASA was demerged from Petroleum Geo-Services and listed on the Oslo Stock Exchange. Teekay acquired majority ownership in the company in December 2006 and Petrojarl ASA became Teekay Petrojarl ASA subsequently.

In September 2017, Brookfield Business partners LP completed a $640 million equity investment in Teekay Offshore Partners L.P., acquiring 60% of the common units of Teekay Offshore. In April 2019, Teekay sold all remaining interests in Teekay Offshore to Brookfield for a further $100 million, signaling their exit from the Offshore space.

LNG shipping
In 2004, Teekay entered LNG shipping business with acquisition of Naviera Tapias, and publicly listed Teekay LNG Partners on the New York Stock Exchange in 2005. Teekay LNG Partners expanded business in 2005 after being awarded major long-term LNG contracts in Qatar and Indonesia.

In July 2014, Teekay signed contracts for six Yamal Icebreaking LNG Carrier Newbuildings in a joint venture between Teekay LNG and China LNG. The first ship, the Eduard Toll, was delivered in January of 2018, and the final of the six vessels, the Yakov Gakkel, was delivered in December 2019. 

In 2021, Teekay announced that Stonepeak Infrastructure Partners would acquire Teekay LNG in a $6.2 billion transaction. The transaction closed on January 13, 2022 and the company was rebranded as Seapeak.

Current operations
Teekay currently operates a fleet of conventional tankers, under head offices in Canada, London, Manila, Mumbai,Bermuda and Singapore, along with a marine services arm based in Australia. 

As of March 2022, the company's leadership consisted of Kenneth Hvid (the President and Group CEO) and Kevin Mackay (President and CEO - Teekay Tankers Ltd.).

References

External links

 Teekay web site
 Petroleum Geo-Services web site

Oil companies of Norway
Companies based in Trondheim
Floating production storage and offloading vessel operators
Transport companies established in 1973
1973 establishments in the Bahamas